This is a list of United States ambassadors appointed by the 46th president of the United States, Joe Biden.

Biden is expected to appoint more ambassadors who are career members of the foreign service compared to former president Donald Trump, who deviated from the 70 percent norm by nominating 56 percent career foreign service members. He is expected to make appointments who will restore America's diplomatic standing after the Trump administration, which included several major campaign donors who were not well received in their host countries. Among the political appointees, more are expected to be policy experts and politicians rather than campaign bundlers.

, according to tracking by The Washington Post and Partnership for Public Service, 145nominees have been confirmed, 40nominees are being considered by the Senate, and 8positions currently do not have nominees.

Color key 
 Announced appointees not yet sent to the Senate.
 Denotes nomination pending before a Senate committee.
 Denotes nomination reported favorably by a Senate committee, pending confirmation by the full Senate
 Confirmed appointees who are political appointees (rather than career foreign service officers)
 Confirmed appointees who are Career Members of the Senior Executive Service or Senior Foreign Service.

Ambassadors to foreign states

Americas

Africa

Asia

Europe

Middle East

Oceania

Ambassadors to international organizations

United States Mission to the United Nations

Other international organizations

Ambassadors-at-large

Trade representatives

Other positions with rank of ambassador

Withdrawn nominations

See also 
Political appointments by Joe Biden
Cabinet of Joe Biden
List of federal judges appointed by Joe Biden
Department of State appointments by Joe Biden
List of ambassadors appointed by Donald Trump

Notes 

Confirmations by roll call vote

Confirmations by voice vote

References

External links 
United States Department of State: Chiefs of Mission by Country
United States Department of State: Chiefs of Mission to International Organizations

2020s politics-related lists
 

Ambassadors